Empress Zhang may refer to:
Empress Zhang Yan, empress of Western Han (192 BC–188 BC)
Empress Zhang (Liu Shan's first wife), empress of Shu Han (223–237)
Empress Zhang (Liu Shan's second wife), empress of Shu Han (238–263)
Empress Zhang (Cao Fang), empress of Cao Wei (252–254)
Empress Zhang Huiguang, empress of Han Zhao (313)
Empress Zhang (Later Zhao), empress of Later Zhao (349)
Empress Zhang (Later Qin), empress of Later Qin (402)
Empress Zhang (Liang dynasty), empress of Liang Dynasty (551)
Empress Zhang Yao'er, empress of Chen Dynasty (557–559)
Empress Zhang (Tang dynasty), empress of the Tang Dynasty (758–762)
Empress Zhang (Later Liang), empress of Later Liang Dynasty (912–913)
 Empress Zhang (Wang Yanzheng), empress of Yin/Min (943-945)
Empress Zhang (Hongxi), empress of the Ming Dynasty (1379-1442)
Empress Zhang (Hongzhi), empress of the Ming Dynasty (1471-1541)
Empress Zhang (Jiajing), empress of the Ming Dynasty (died 1537)
Empress Zhang Baozhu, empress of the Ming Dynasty (1606-1644)

See also
Empress Dowager Zhang (disambiguation)

Zhang